Scott McKay (born Carl Gose, May 28, 1915 – March 16, 1987) was an American film, television and theatre actor.

Life and career 
McKay was born in Pleasantville, Iowa as Carl Gose. He attended the University of Colorado, specializing in English literature. He first worked in theatre as a straight man for a magician. McKay also was a professor of English literature. He then performed in Broadway plays in 1939, first appearing in The American Way, being credited as the ensemble. Later in his career, McKay appeared in numerous Broadway plays. He played Captain Fisby in The Teahouse of the August Moon  replacing John Forsythe. McKay also played David Larabee in Sabrina Fair. He played Jeff Douglas in Brigadoon (1967). His final theatre credit was as Ronald in Absurd Person Singular (1974).

McKay began his film and television career in 1944, playing Dr. Dan Proctor in the film Guest in the House. He then starred in the film Thirty Seconds Over Tokyo as Captain David M. Jones. McKay played Private Jimmy Earhart in the 1945 film Kiss and Tell. He also played Sid in the 1946 film Duel in the Sun. In 1954, McKay starred with actress Celeste Holm in the new CBS situation comedy television series Honestly, Celeste!  as Bob Wallace and Holm played Celeste Anders. He played Mr. Gilling in the 1979 film The Bell Jar. His final credit was from the 1980 film Christmas Evil, in which McKay played Mr. Fletcher.

Death 
McKay died in March 1987 of kidney failure at the Cabrini Medical Center in New York, at the age of 71.

References

External links 

Rotten Tomatoes profile

1915 births
1987 deaths
People from Iowa
Male actors from Iowa
American male film actors
American male stage actors
American male television actors
20th-century American male actors
University of Colorado alumni